Faina Potapova (born 12 September 1996) is a Kazakhstani racing cyclist, who last rode for Russian amateur team InEx Siberian Team.

Major results
Source: 

2014
 2nd Scratch, Track Clubs ACC Cup
2015
 3rd Road race, National Road Championships
2016
 2nd Team pursuit, Track Clubs ACC Cup (with Nadezhda Geneleva, Tatyana Geneleva and Yekaterina Yuraitis)
 3rd Road race, National Road Championships
2017
 2nd Road race, National Road Championships
2018
 2nd Time trial, National Road Championships
2019
 2nd  Team time trial, Asian Road Championships
2021
 2nd Road race, National Road Championships
2022
 2nd  Team time trial, Asian Road Championships
 2nd  Team pursuit, Asian Track Championships

See also
 List of 2016 UCI Women's Teams and riders

References

External links
 
 

1996 births
Living people
Kazakhstani female cyclists
Place of birth missing (living people)
21st-century Kazakhstani women